Evaldo Silva dos Santos (born January 4, 1983 in Janaúba-MG), or simply Evaldo, is a Brazilian central defender who plays for CRAC.

Honours
Brazil cup 500: 2001
São Paulo State League: 2004
Rio Grande do Sul State League: 2006
Runner-up champion act of the state of Bahia 2009
Vice champion of the Brazilian championship series C 2010
champion of the interior of the state Minas Gerais 2013
champion of the interior of the state Rio Grande do sul 2014

References

External links
  
 globoesporte 
 
 Evaldo at ZeroZero

1983 births
Living people
Brazilian footballers
Brazilian expatriate footballers
Associação Portuguesa de Desportos players
Associação Desportiva São Caetano players
Vila Nova Futebol Clube players
Grêmio Foot-Ball Porto Alegrense players
FC Tokyo players
Santos FC players
Coritiba Foot Ball Club players
Esporte Clube Bahia players
Associação Atlética Ponte Preta players
Criciúma Esporte Clube players
Esporte Clube Juventude players
Tarxien Rainbows F.C. players
Selangor FA players
Expatriate footballers in Japan
Expatriate footballers in Malta
J1 League players
Expatriate footballers in Malaysia
Association football central defenders